Dyella marensis is a Gram-negative bacterium from the genus of Dyella which has been isolated from cliff soil from the Mara Island on Korea.

References

Xanthomonadales
Bacteria described in 2009